Cheras Highway, Federal Route 1 also known as Cheras Road and Loke Yew Road is a major highway in Kuala Lumpur, Malaysia.

History

This highway was upgraded in 1988 by Metramac Corporation Sdn.Bhd. The Cheras Road toll plaza began operation from 1 September 1990. After being suspended a year later before reopening on 15 September 1991, toll charges reduced by 50 percent from the usual RM1. After many complaints and traffic jams, the toll plaza was abolished on 14 September 2003 and replaced by Taman Midah MRT station on 17 July 2017.  Today, the highway is maintained by Kuala Lumpur City Hall (DBKL).

Due to the congestion that clogged the Cheras Highway, two projects were led by the Kuala Lumpur City Hall (DBKL). These included an underpass from the Cheras–Kajang Expressway to Taman Connaught and flyovers  to Taman Len Seng and Alam Damai. It was opened on 14 April 2008. Other projects are Bulatan Cheras–Bandar Tun Razak roundabout underpass from Cheras Highway to Cheras Road and Jalan Tenteram was opened on 2010. The Sungai Buloh–Kajang MRT line runs along much of the highway, starting from Taman Pertama MRT station, past the Taman Connaught interchange and along the Cheras-Kajang Expressway to Kajang.

Cheras Highway floods 2014
A flash floods in Cheras Highway near Cheras Leisure Mall in Cheras occurred on 23 August 2014 caused a massive traffic congestion in many parts of the city centre.

List of interchanges

See also
 Federal route 1
 Kuala Lumpur–Rawang Highway
 Kuala Lumpur

Highways in Malaysia
Expressways and highways in the Klang Valley